Marco Flores may refer to:
 Marcos Flores (born 1985), Argentine footballer
 Marco Flores (Peruvian footballer) (born 1977)
 Marco Flores (songwriter)
 Marco Flores (swimmer)